Thomas Michael Christian Mertens (born 10 March 1950 in Freiburg im Breisgau) is a German virologist who currently heads the Standing Committee on Vaccination (STIKO), which as part of the Robert Koch Institute advises the German government regarding vaccines.

Career  
From 1968 to 1976, Mertens first studied chemistry in Cologne and then medicine in Bonn, where he completed his dissertation (Dr. med.) under the supervision of :de:Hans Joachim Eggers in 1976. He obtained his medical license (approbation) in 1977. In 1984 he completed his habilitation in virology. From 1985 until 1991 he was professor at the Institute of Virology in Cologne, after which he moved to University of Ulm, heading the Institute of Virology at the University Clinic there from 1998. In 2018 he retired from his position as professor of virology and medical director. In his research, Mertens worked extensively on herpes viruses, in particular HCMV.

In 2004, Mertens joined the Standing Committee on Vaccination (STIKO), and became its head in 2017.

COVID-19 pandemic 
During the COVID-19 pandemic in Germany, after vaccines became available in late 2020, STIKO and Mertens moved into the focus of politics, the wider public, and the media.
Mertens repeatedly criticized what he said was pressure on STIKO from politics. He himself was criticized for having allegedly confused the public on several occasions, and for having announced an upcoming STIKO recommendation for a booster shot for all adults in a talk show, rather than through standard channels, in November 2021.

In early December 2020, shortly before the rollout of the Pfizer–BioNTech COVID-19 vaccine and the Moderna COVID-19 vaccine in Germany, Mertens said that it would take over a year to vaccinate the whole population of Germany, due to capacity limits. In September 2021, Mertens expressed dissatisfaction about vaccine hesitancy in Germany particularly in the age group between 18 and 59 years, stressing the importance of the vaccination rate of that group for the evolution of the fourth wave of the pandemic and beyond.

In early December 2021, Mertens stated in a podcast by Frankfurter Allgemeine Zeitung that if he had a seven- to eight-year old child, he would "probably" refrain from having it vaccinated against the coronavirus at that time; soon after, in a 10 December interview with Die Welt, he however stated that he regretted having said anything personal at all, that any suspicions that he himself was a vaccination sceptic were "complete nonsense", and that he had never opposed vaccination. His previous comment had been taken out of context and had been completely correct and comprehensible, he said. At the time of the Die Welt interview, the STIKO had only recommended vaccination to those children between five and eleven years of age which belonged to risk groups, while also opening it to other children of that age group on the condition that parents had a discussion with a doctor. In May 2022, the RKI updated its vaccine recommendations to include a single shot of an mRNA vaccine for healthy children from the age of five years for the Pfizer–BioNTech vaccine, and from six years for Moderna.

Mertens became an inaugural member of the Corona-Expertenrat (corona advisory panel) established by the Scholz cabinet in December 2021.

In January 2022, Mertens said that he opposed a COVID-19 general vaccine mandate for all aged 18 and over, as this would "divide society". He also expressed doubt about whether such a measure would actually be effective, as even the threat of a fine would possibly not change the minds of those who did not want to be vaccinated. He also opined that the severe COVID-19 wave at that time could not be reined in by a general mandate. In April 2022, he welcomed that the push for a general vaccine mandate had been abandoned in the Bundestag parliament, saying that the "main reason" for such a mandate, namely stemming the spread of the virus, could at present not be achieved through vaccination; and that it was "more sensible to limit the vaccine mandate to vulnerable groups".

Personal life 
Mertens has four children of adult age. His hobby is playing the clarinet.

Books (as editor)

References

External links

German virologists
Robert Koch Institute people
Academic staff of the University of Ulm
People from Freiburg im Breisgau
1950 births
Living people